Oliva Blanchette (6 May 1929 – 25 June 2021) was an American philosopher and Professor of Philosophy at Boston College. He was a former president of the Metaphysical Society of America (1999).

Blanchette won the J.N. Findlay Award of the Metaphysical Society of America in 2007 for Philosophy of Being (2002). He is also known for having translated works of Maurice Blondel into English.

Bibliography (partial)

References

1929 births
2021 deaths
20th-century American philosophers
Philosophy academics
Presidents of the Metaphysical Society of America
Boston College faculty